Francis Caulfeild was an Irish politician.

Caulfeild was born in Chester and educated at  Trinity College, Dublin. He represented  Armagh County from 1758 to 1761; and for Charlemont from 1761 to 1776.

References

Francis
People from Chester
Irish MPs 1727–1760
Irish MPs 1761–1768
Irish MPs 1769–1776
Members of the Parliament of Ireland (pre-1801) for County Armagh constituencies
Alumni of Trinity College Dublin